The 2015–16 Nemzeti Bajnokság II is Hungary's second-level football competition. The championship was won by Gyirmót FC Győr and they were also promoted to the 2016–17 Nemzeti Bajnokság I along with Mezőkövesd-Zsóry SE. Three teams including Szigetszentmiklósi TK, Dunaújváros PASE, and FC Ajka were relegated to the 2016–17 Nemzeti Bajnokság III.

Teams
At the end of 2014-15 season, Vasas and Békéscsaba promoted to Nemzeti Bajnokság I.

Two teams were relegated to Nemzeti Bajnokság III : Cegléd and Kaposvári Rákóczi.

The winners of the three 2014–15 Nemzeti Bajnokság III series were promoted to NB III: Budaörs, Vác and Várda.

Stadium and locations

Following is the list of clubs competing in 2015–16 Nemzeti Bajnokság II, with their location, stadium and stadium capacity.

Personnel and kits
Following is the list of clubs competing in 2015–16 Nemzeti Bajnokság II, with their manager, captain, kit manufacturer and shirt sponsor.

League table

Results

Season statistics

Top goalscorers

Updated to games played on 30 November 2015

Number of teams by counties

See also
 2015–16 Magyar Kupa
 2015–16 Nemzeti Bajnokság I
 2015–16 Nemzeti Bajnokság III

References

External links
  
  

Nemzeti Bajnokság II seasons
2015–16 in Hungarian football
Hun